Dicker is a surname. Notable people with the surname include:

Cameron Dicker (born 2000), American football player
Cintia Dicker (born 1986), Brazilian model
Fred Dicker (21st century), American radio host
Fredric U. Dicker (21st century), American columnist
Friedl Dicker-Brandeis (1898–1944), Austrian artist and educator murdered by the Nazis in the Auschwitz-Birkenau extermination camp
Gary Dicker (born 1986), Irish footballer
Joël Dicker, Swiss novelist
John Dicker (1815–1895), English cricketer
Les Dicker, (1926–2020), English professional footballer
Madeline Dicker (1899 –), Irish spy during the War of Independence

Ruth Dicker (1919–2004), American painter
Samuel Dicker (died 1760), English politician

See also
Rick Dicker, a fictional character from The Incredibles
Dikkers
Loek Dikker (born 1944), Dutch pianist, conductor, and composer